24Herbs (stylized as 24HERBS, Chinese: 廿四味; pinyin: niàn sì wèi) is a Hong Kong hip hop group formed in 2006 consisting of six members: Ghost Style, Phat Chan, Kit Leung, Sir JBS, Drunk and Dor Yuk.

History

Early years and self-titled debut album (2006-2010)
24Herbs was first formed in 2006. In 2008, the group released their self-titled debut album 24Herbs. The deluxe version of the album included a remix of their song Jiu Jo (照做) with a guest feature from Chinese-American rapper MC Jin.

During this time, 24Herbs collaborated with various other artists, including on Forgiveness with Sammi Cheng, Laser with Charmaine Fong and Love The Most (愛最大) with Nicholas Tse. They were also actively involved in the Hong Kong film industry: they wrote and performed the theme song for the film Once a Gangster, and guest-starred in the film.

Bring It On and Sleeping Dogs (2011-2012)
In March 2011, 24Herbs released their second album, Bring It On. The record featured a number of songs with featured vocalists, including Wonderland with Janice Vidal, the music video for which has over 10 million views on YouTube as of 2021. Additional collaborations include Control with Paul Wong and Chillax with Taiwanese rapper Softlipa, as well as a collaboration with fellow Hong Kong group Kolor on the bonus track 24K.

24Herbs performed several live shows to promote the album including "24K Concert" in December 2010, in which they shared stage with Kolor and in "Moov Live 24Herbs" in January 2011, which was also documented and compiled along with multiple official music videos as a bonus DVD in the release of Bring It On.

Five tracks from Bring It On are featured on the soundtrack of the 2012 video game Sleeping Dogs: Turn It Up, Do You Know Me, Hong Kong Kowloon, Sin City and No Brothers (不是兄弟) featuring Hong Kong rapper KZ. The group's popularity increased with international audiences due to the video game's popularity.

Non-album singles, 24/7TALK podcast (2013-present) 
Since the release of Bring It On, 24Herbs have released a number of non-album singles on their YouTube channel and streaming services, including Hot In The 852 in 2013, Work It in 2015, Go Hard in 2017, and M.L.Y. in 2019. 

Since 2017, 24Herbs have hosted a podcast on their YouTube channel named 24/7TALK, in which they regularly invite well-known local and international celebrities on as guest speakers. These guests have included Chapman To, Daniel Wu and Eric Tsang.

Members
 Phat Chan: Hong Kong rapper, actor, cinematographer, editor, member of Hong Kong hip-hop group LMF
 Kit Leung: Hong Kong rapper and actor, member of Hong Kong hip-hop group LMF
 Conroy Chan (born 1972 in Hong Kong), also known as Drunk: Hong Kong actor, producer and rapper, starred in over 30 movies, was once a member of pop group Alive
 Brandon Ho (born 1973 in Montreal, Quebec, Canada), better known as Ghost Style or Gee Style: Chinese-Canadian rapper, producer, DJ, guitarist and actor
 Julius Brian Siswojo (born 1974 in Jakarta, Indonesia), better known as Sir JBS, Sir Eats-a-Lot, or simply JBS: Indonesian rapper, actor, skateboarder, fashion designer, founder and owner of Hong Kong-based skate shop 8FIVE2
 Eddie Chung, also known as Dor Yuk: Hong Kong commercial music producer and actor

Discography

Studio albums

Singles

Videography

Music videos

References 

Hong Kong hip hop groups